This article contains a list of business schools in Asia.

Bangladesh 

Institute of Business Administration (IBA), University of Dhaka
Army Institute of Business Administration (Army IBA)
 Bangladesh University of Professionals (BUP)
 Faculty of Business Administration (FBA), Chittagong University
 Faculty of Business Studies, University of Dhaka
 Faculty of Business Studies (FBS), Jagannath University
 Faculty of Business Studies (FBS), Jahangirnagar University
 Faculty of Business Studies (FBS), Rajshahi University
Institute of Business Administration (IBA), Jahangirnagar University
Institute of Business Administration (IBA), University of Rajshahi
 Management & Business Administration School, Khulna University
North South University (NSU)
Brac University (BRACU) 
Independent University Bangladesh (IUB) 
East West University (EWU)
 United International University (UIU)

Cambodia 
American Intercon Institute, Phnom Penh
CamEd Business School, Phnom Penh

Vietnam 
 University of Hawaii, Shidler College of Business (Executive MBA), Hanoi
 University of Hawaii, Shidler College of Business (Executive MBA), Ho Chi Minh City

People's Republic of China 

 Beijing Institute of Technology (School of Management & Economics)
Beijing International MBA (BiMBA)
Beijing Normal University (School of Economics & Business Administration)
Beijing University of Technology (Economics & Management School)
 Cheung Kong Graduate School of Business (CKGSB)
China Europe International Business School (CEIBS)
Dalian University of Technology (School of Management)
 Dongbei University of Finance & Economics
East China Normal University (School of Business)
East China University of Science & Technology (School of Business)
Foshan University (Business School)
Fudan University (School of Management)
Harbin Institute of Technology (School of Management)
Hebei University of Engineering (School of Economy and Management)
 Hult International Business School
 Hunan University (School of Business)
Hunan Normal University (College of Commerce)
Jilin University (Business School)
Jinan University (Management School & Internation
Nanjing University (School of Business)
 Nanjing University of Technology (College of Economics & Management)
Nankai University (School of Business)
Peking University (Peking University HSBC Business School; Beijing International MBA; Guanghua School of Management)
Renmin University of China (School of Business – 60 contacts)
Shanghai Institute of Foreign Trade
Shanghai Jiao Tong University (Antai College of Economics & Management)
Shantou University (Business School)
Shanxi University (School of Economics & Business Administration; School of Management)
Shanghai University (School of Management)
Shanghai University of Finance & Economics
South China University of Technology (School of Economics and Business Administration)
Southeast University (School of Economics & Management)
Southwest Jiaotong University (School of Economics and Business Administration)
Southwestern University of Finance and Economics
Sun Yat Sen University (Business School & International Business School)
Tianjin University (Faculty of Management & Economics)
Tongji University (School of Economics & Management)
Tsinghua University (School of Economics & Management; School of Public Policy & Management)
University of Electronic Science & Technology (School of Economics & Management)
University of International Business & Economics (UIBE) (Business School)
Wuhan University (School of Economics & Management)
Xi'an Jiaotong-Liverpool University (Department of Business, Economics & Management)
Xiamen University (School of Management)
Xidian University (School of Economics & Management)
Zhejiang Gongshang University (School of Business Administration)
Zhejiang University (School of Management)

Hong Kong 
Caritas Institute of Higher Education
Centennial College, University of Hong Kong
College of Business, City University of Hong Kong
Faculty of Business Administration, The Chinese University of Hong Kong
HKU Business School, University of Hong Kong
Faculty of Business, Chu Hai College of Higher Education
Faculty of Business, Hong Kong Polytechnic University
Faculty of Business, Lingnan University
School of Business and Management, HKUST, Hong Kong University of Science and Technology
Hong Kong Shue Yan University
Lee Shau Kee School of Business and Administration, Open University of Hong Kong
School of Business, Hong Kong Baptist University
School of Business, Hang Seng Management College
School of Business, Tung Wah College

India 

University of Petroleum and Energy Studies| Dehradun
Alliance University, Bangalore
Asian Business School| Noida
Amrita School of Business, Coimbatore
ASBM University, Bhubaneswar, Odisha
Asia Pacific Institute of Management, New Delhi
Banaras Hindu University (BHU), Varanasi
Vishwavishwani Business School, Hyderabad, Andhra Pradesh
Bharathidasan Institute of Management, Trichy
Birla Institute of Management and Technology (BIMTECH), National Capital Region
Centre for Management Studies, Dharamsinh Desai University, Nadiad, Gujarat
Chandragupt Institute of Management, Patna
Christ University, Bangalore
Dr. Gaur Hari Singhania Institute of Management and Research, Kanpur, Uttar Pradesh
Delhi School of Economics, Delhi
Department of Business and Sustainability, TERI School of Advanced Studies, New Delhi
Department of Business Economics (MBE), Delhi
Department of Business Management, University of Calcutta, Kolkata
Department of Financial Studies, Delhi
 Department of Management, Makhanlal Chaturvedi National University of Journalism and Communication, Bhopal, INDIA
Department of Management Studies, IIT Roorkee (DoMS, IIT Roorkee), Roorkee, Uttarakhand
Department of Management Studies IIT Delhi (DMS, IIT Delhi), Delhi
Department of Management Studies IIT Madras (DoMS, IIT Madras), Chennai
DoMS, Indian Institute of Science (Department of Management Studies IISc Bangalore), Bangalore
Department of Management Studies, Indian School of Mines, Dhanbad
DoMS NIT Trichy, Trichy
EMPI Business School
Faculty of Management Studies, Banaras Hindu University, Varanasi
Faculty of Management Studies, University of Delhi
Fr. Agnels Business School (FCRIMS), Navi Mumbai
Goa Institute of Management, Goa
Graphic Era Business School, Dehradun
Great Lakes Institute of Management, Chennai
Great Lakes Institute of Management, Gurgaon
Guru Nanak Institute of Technology Faculty of Management Studies, GNIT FMS Kolkata
ICFAI Business School (IBS Business School, Dehradun)
ICFAI Business School, Hyderabad
IIKM Business School, Chennai
IILM GSM, Greater Noida
IIT Kharagpur
Indian Institute of Foreign Trade IIFT, Delhi
Indian Institute of Information Technology, Allahabad
Indian Institute of Information Technology and Management, Gwalior
Indian Institute of Management Ahmedabad
Indian Institute of Management Amritsar
 Indian Institute of Management and Engineering, Bangalore
Indian Institute of Management Bangalore
Indian Institute of Management Bodh Gaya
Indian Institute of Management Calcutta
Indian Institute of Management Gaya, Gaya
Indian Institute of Management Indore
Indian Institute of Management Kashipur
Indian Institute of Management Kozhikode
Indian Institute of Management Lucknow
Indian Institute of Management Nagpur
Indian Institute of Management Ranchi
Indian Institute of Management Rohtak
Indian Institute of Management Sambalpur
Indian Institute of Management Shillong
Indian Institute of Management Sirmaur
Indian Institute of Management Tiruchirappalli (Trichy)
Indian Institute of Management Udaipur
Indian Institute of Management Visakhapatnam
Indian Institute of Social Welfare and Business Management, IISWBM Kolkata
Indian School of Business (ISB), Hyderabad
Indian School of Business (ISB), Mohali
Indira Gandhi National Open University (IGNOU), New Delhi, Delhi
Institute of Business Management & Technology (IBMT), Bangalore
IFIM Business School Bangalore
Institute of Health Management Research, Jaipur
Faculty of Management Studies – Institute of Rural Management, Jaipur (FMS-IRM), Jaipur
IPS Business School, Jaipur
Institute of Management & Technology, Ghaziabad
Institute of Management Studies DAVV, Indore
Institute of Management Studies, Devi Ahilya University, IMS, DAVV, Indore
Institute of Public Enterprise, Hyderabad, Andhra Pradesh
Institute of science and management, Ranchi
International Management Institute, New Delhi
International School of Management and Research (ISMR), Pune
Indian School of Business & Finance, New Delhi
ITM-IFM Institute for Technology and Management – Institute of Financial Markets, Vashi
Jagan Institute of Management Studies, Delhi
Jain University, Bangalore, Karnataka
Jaipur Business School, Jaipur
Jamnalal Bajaj Institute of Management Studies, Mumbai
KIIT School of Management, Bhubaneswar (KSOM)
KJ Somaiya Institute of Management Studies and Research (SIMSR), Mumbai
Lal Bahadur Shastri Institute of Management (LBSIM), New Delhi
Loyola Institute of Business Administration, Chennai
Madras School of Economics, Chennai
Madurai Kamaraj University, Madurai
Management Development Institute, Gurgaon
Manipal Institute of Management, Manipal, Karnataka
Maslow Business School (MBS), Ghaziabad
 MET (Mumbai Educational Trust) Institute of Management Studies, Bandra, Mumbai
School of Business, Pune, Maharashtra
Mukesh Patel School of Technology Management and Engineering, Mumbai
Narsee Monjee Institute of Management Studies (NMIMS), Mumbai
NMIMS Global Access School for Continuing Education (NGASCE), Mumbai
National Institute of Industrial Engineering (NITIE), Mumbai
National Institute of Agricultural Marketing, Jaipur
National Management School / Georgia State University, Chennai
New Delhi Institute of Management
NIILM CMS, Greater Noida
NIILM School of Business (NSB), New Delhi and Kolkata
OCTAVE Business School, Pune
Omega Institute Of Management & Technology, [New Delhi] [OIMT]
PCTE Group of Institutes, Ludhiana
PPG Business School, Coimbatore
PRIST University, Thanjavur
Quantum School of Business, Roorkee, Uttarakhand
Rajalakshmi School of Management, Rajalakshmi Engineering College, Chennai, Tamil Nadu
RNB Global University, Bikaner, Rajasthan
S P Jain Institute of Management and Research (SPJIMR), Mumbai
School of Communication and Management Studies (SCMS), Cochin
School of Management, National Institute of Technology Warangal
 School of Management Science, Tezpur University, Tezpur
School of Petroleum Management (SPM), Gandhinagar
SDM Institute for Management Development (SDM IMD), Mysore
SelaQui Academy of Higher Education (SAHE), Dehradun
Shailesh J Mehta School of Management, IIT Bombay
SIES College of Management Studies (SIESCOMS), Navi Mumbai
SSR Institute of Management and Research (SSRIMR), Union Territory of Dadra and Nagar Haveli and Daman and Diu
St Joseph's Institute of Management (SJIM), Bangalore
St. Joseph's Institute of Management
St Hopkins College of Management, Bangalore
Symbiosis Institute of Management Studies
Millennium School of Business
T. A. Pai Management Institute, Manipal
Taxila Business School, Jaipur
Times Business School (TBS), Delhi, Navi Mumbai and Ahmedabad
Unitedworld School of Business, Ahmedabad
Universal Business School. Karjat
University Business School, Chandigarh
Vanguard Business School, Bangalore
Venkateshwara Open University
VIT Business School, Vellore
Vivekanand Education Society's Institute of Management Studies and Research, Mumbai
Welingkar Institute of Management Development and Research, Mumbai
Woxsen School of Business
Xavier Institute of Management and Entrepreneurship (XIME)
Xavier Institute of Management, Bhubaneswar (XIMB)
XLRI Jamshedpur, Jamshedpur
Medhavi Skill University, Sikkim

Indonesia 
BINUS Business School, Jakarta
Indonesia Institute for Management Development IPMI Business School, Jakarta
Master of Management Program - Universitas Airlangga, Surabaya
Master of Management Program - Universitas Andalas, Padang
Master of Management Program - Universitas Gadjah Mada, Yogyakarta
Master of Management Program - Universitas Indonesia, Jakarta
Master of Management Program - Universitas Jenderal Soedirman, Purwokerto
Master of Management Program - Universitas Lampung, Bandar Lampung
School of Business and Management, Institut Teknologi Bandung, Bandung
Master of Management Program - Universitas Surabaya, Surabaya
Petra Christian University, Surabaya
PPM School of Management, Jakarta
Prasetiya Mulya Business School, Jakarta
President University, Cikarang
SAE Institute, Jakarta
Sampoerna School of Business, Jakarta
Thames Business School, Jakarta

Iran 
Mahan Business School, The First Business School in Iran (Founded in 2001)
KBS, Khajeh nasir Business School (K.N.Toosi University of Technology since 1928)
Paivaran, Institute of Management, Research & Education
MANA, Institute of Management & Technology Development

Israel 
Bar-Ilan University, Petah-Tikva
Ben-Gurion University of the Negev, Beer-Sheva
The College of Management Academic Studies, Rishon LeZion
Hebrew University of Jerusalem, Jeruslam
Interdisciplinary Center, Herzlia
Recanati Graduate School of Business Administration, Tel-Aviv
Technion – Israel Institute of Technology, Haifa
University of Haifa, Haifa

Japan 
Aoyama Gakuin University
Doshisha Business School
Globis University Graduate School of Management
Hitotsubashi University
International University of Japan
Keio Business School
Kwansei Gakuin University
Nagoya University
NUCB Business School
University of Tsukuba
Waseda University

Kuwait 
American University of Kuwait

Lebanon 
American University of Beirut, Suliman S. Olayan School of Business

Macau 
City University of Macau (Faculty of Business)
Macao Polytechnic University (Faculty of Business)
Macau University of Science and Technology (School of Business)
University of Macau (Faculty of Business Administration)
University of Saint Joseph (Faculty of Business and Law)

Malaysia 
Asia e University (AeU)
Asia School of Business - In collaboration with MIT Sloan School of Management
Han Chiang University College of Communication School of Business and Management (SBM)
International Islamic University of Malaysia (IIUM)
Monash University Malaysia Campus
Multimedia University (MMU) Faculty of Business (FOB)
New Era University College Faculty of Accountancy, Management and Economics (FAME)
Open University Malaysia (OUM) OUM Business School
Southern University College Faculty of Business and Management (FBM)
Sunway University Business School
Swinburne University of Technology
Taylor's University
Tunku Abdul Rahman University College (TARUC) Faculty of Accountancy, Finance & Business (FAFB)
University Kebangsaan Malaysia (UKM)
University of Malaya (UM)
Universiti Putra Malaysia (UPM)
Universiti Teknologi Malaysia (UTM)
Universiti Tunku Abdul Rahman (UTAR) Faculty of Business and Finance (FBF) & Faculty of Accountancy and Management (FAM)
University Utara Malaysia (UUM)

Myanmar 
 Meiktila Institute of Economics
 Monywa Institute of Economics
 Yangon Institute of Economics
 National Management Degree College
 Victoria University College Myanmar
 Myanmar Institute of Education

Pakistan 

Abasyn University, Department of Management Sciences, Peshawar
Air University, Faculty of Administrative Sciences, Islamabad
Al-Khair University, Faculty of Management Science, Abbottabad
Bahria University, Islamabad
Bahria University, Karachi
Bahauddin Zakariya University, Institute of Management Sciences, Multan
Fatima Jinnah University, School of Management Sciences, Rawalpindi
Forman Christian College University, School of Management (SOM)
Foundation University, Institute of Engineering & Management Sciences
GIFT University, Gujranwala
Gomal University, Department of Business Administration, Dera Ismail Khan
Government College University, Lahore (GC), Lahore
Hamdard University, Hamdard Institute of Management Sciences, Karachi
Hazara University, Government College of Management Sciences Abbottabad
Imperial College of Business Studies (ICBS), Lahore
Institute of Business Administration, Karachi, Department of Management, Karachi
Institute of Business Administration, Sukkar, Business Administration Faculty, Sukkar
Institute of Business Management, College of Business Management, Karachi
International Islamic University, Faculty of Management Sciences, Islamabad
Iqra University, Faculty of Business Administration, Quetta
Iqra University, Karachi
Islamia University Bahawalpur, Department of Management Science, Bahawalpur
Lahore School of Economics
Lahore University of Management Sciences, Suleman Dawood School of Business
MDi Pakistan, Management Development Institute – Pakistan, in partnership with University of Southern Queensland, Islamabad
Muhammad Ali Jinnah University, Faculty of Management & Social Science, Islamabad
Muhammad Ali Jinnah University, Karachi
National College of Business Administration & Economics, Lahore, School of Business Administration
National University of Computer and Emerging Sciences - FAST NU, Islamabad and Lahore
National University of Sciences and Technology, NUST Business School, Islamabad
Preston Institute of Management Science and Technology, Institute of Management Sciences & Technology, Kohat
Quaid-i-Azam University, Department of Administrative Sciences, Islamabad
Riphah International University, Faculty of Management Sciences, Islamabad
School of Business and Management, Faculty of Management Sciences, Islamabad
Shaheed Zulfikar Ali Bhutto Institute of Science & Technology (SZABIST), Department of Management Sciences, Karachi
University of Balochistan, Institute of Management Sciences, Quetta
University of Central Punjab (UCP), Lahore
University of Faisalabad, College of Management Studies
University of Karachi, Karachi University Business School, Karachi
University of Lahore, Lahore Business School
University of Malakand, Commerce College, Thana
University of Management and Technology (UMT), Lahore
University of Peshawar, Institute of Management Studies
University of the Punjab, Hailey college of commerce, Lahore
University of the Punjab, Hailey College of Banking & Finance, Lahore
University of the Punjab, Institute of Business Administration and Information Technology (IBIT), Lahore
University of the Punjab, Institute of Business Administration, Lahore
University of Sindh, Jamshoro, Hyderabad

Philippines 

ABE International Business College
ACSI College-Iloilo
Adamson University College of Business Administration
Adventist University of the Philippines
Asian Institute of Management; Washington SyCip Graduate School of Business
Ateneo Graduate School of Business
Comteq Computer and Business College
De La Salle University School of Economics; Ramon V. del Rosario College of Business
Far Eastern University – Institute of Accounts, Business and Finance
International Academy of Management and Economics
Laguna College of Business and Arts
National College of Business and Arts
Philippine School of Business Administration
San Pedro College of Business Administration
Silliman University College of Business Administration
University of the East College of Business Administration
University of the Philippines Diliman; Cesar E.A. Virata School of Business
University of San Carlos School of Business and Economics
University of Santo Tomas College of Commerce and Business Administration; Alfredo M. Velayo College of Accountancy
Bestlink College of Hospitality and Business Management

Singapore 
Aventis School of Management
Curtin Education Centre
ESSEC Business School
INSEAD, Singapore campus
James Cook University Singapore
Raffles Leadership Centre
Singapore Management University (Lee Kong Chian School of Business), triple accreditation
Nanyang Technological University (Nanyang Business School)
National University of Singapore (NUS Business School)
S P Jain School of Global Management
Singapore Institute of Management

South Korea 
Ajou University
Chonnam National University
Hanyang University
KAIST Business School, KAIST, Seoul
KDI School - the school belonging to the Korea Development Institute
Korea University Business School
Kyungpook National University
Pusan National University, College of Business
Sejong University
Seoul National University, College of Business
Seoul School of Integrated Sciences and Technologies (aSSIST)
Sogang University
SolBridge International School of Business
Sungkyunkwan University
Yonsei University

Sri Lanka 
Department of Business and Information Management, Sri Lanka Institute of Information Technology
Faculty of Commerce and Management, University of Kelaniya
Faculty of Graduate Studies, University of Colombo
Faculty of Management and Finance, University of Colombo
Faculty of Management and Finance, University of Ruhuna
Faculty of Management Sciences, University of Moratuwa
Faculty of Management Studies and Commerce, Eastern University of Sri Lanka
Faculty of Management Studies and Commerce, University of Jaffna
Faculty of Management Studies, Sabaragamuwa University of Sri Lanka
National Institute of Business Management
Postgraduate Institute of Management, University of Sri Jayewardenepura
Faculty of Graduate Studies, General Sir John Kotelawala Defence University
Army School of Logistics

Taiwan 
Fu Jen Catholic University College of Management
National Chengchi University College of Commerce
National Chung Cheng University College of Management
National Cheng Kung University College of Management
National Dong Hwa University School of Management
National Sun Yat-sen University College of Management
National Taiwan University College of Management
National Tsing Hua University College of Technology Management
Ming Chuan University College of Management

Thailand 
Asian Institute of Technology, School of Management
Assumption University, School of Management
Chiang Mai University, Chiang Mai University Business School
Chulalongkorn University, Chulalongkorn Business School
Chulalongkorn University, Sasin Graduate Institute of Business Administration
College of Management Mahidol University
Kasetsart University, Kasetsart Business School
National Institute of Development Administration, NIDA Business School
Siam University, MBA programme
Sripatum University, Sripatum Business School
Thammasat University, Thammasat Business School
University of the Thai Chamber of Commerce, School of Business

United Arab Emirates 
Abu Dhabi University College of Business Administration in Abu Dhabi and Al Ain
American University of Dubai School of Business Administration in Dubai
American University of Sharjah School of Business and Management (SBM) in Sharjah
London Business School Executive MBA program in Dubai
University of Sharjah College of Business Administration in Sharjah
Exeed School of Business and Finance Business School in Sharjah

See also 
Lists of business school, other continents
 List of business schools in Africa
 List of business schools in Australia
 List of business schools in Europe
 List of business schools in the United States

References 

Asia
Business School